Bryan Kei Mantia (born February 4, 1963), known professionally as Brain, is an American rock drummer. He has played with bands such as Primus, Guns N' Roses, Praxis, and Godflesh, and with other performers such as Tom Waits, Serj Tankian, Bill Laswell, Bootsy Collins, Les Claypool, and Buckethead. He has also done session work for numerous artists and bands.

History 
Mantia was born February 4, 1963, in the South Bay city of Cupertino, California, to an Italian American father and a Japanese American mother. As a teenager, Mantia became interested in such artists as James Brown, Led Zeppelin, and Jimi Hendrix, acts that featured groove-heavy sounds. When he was 16 years old, he started playing drums. Because of his 'obsessive' study of the drum book Portraits in Rhythm by Anthony J. Cirone, Mantia was given the nickname "Brain" by members of his high school concert band.

Mantia attended the Percussion Institute of Technology in Hollywood, California, during the mid-1980s to further hone his craft. During this time, he was a member of local funk-rock band named the Limbomaniacs (which would later become part of Ben Wa). In 1989, Mantia joined Primus briefly, before breaking his foot, forcing him to pull out of the band.

In the early '90s, he joined Praxis, a musical project led by Bill Laswell and initially featuring Bernie Worrell, Bootsy Collins and Buckethead. The drummer was a mainstay of Praxis for the 1990s, featuring on most of their albums. Mantia recorded with Buckethead on many of Buckethead's solo albums, including Monsters and Robots, Colma, The Cuckoo Clocks of Hell, and Bucketheadland 2, among others.

Mantia appeared on releases by the industrial metal band Godflesh in the late 1990s, including Songs of Love and Hate, and Love and Hate in Dub. In 1996, Mantia rejoined Primus, touring with and recording for four years with the group, appearing on The Brown Album, Rhinoplasty and Antipop.

In March 2000, Mantia joined the revamped lineup of Guns N' Roses after being recommended to singer Axl Rose by Buckethead (who himself had joined the band a few months earlier).

In 2003, Mantia appeared on several songs on BT's 2003 release Emotional Technology as well BT's score for the 2003 film Monster.

Mantia toured several legs of the Chinese Democracy Tour with Guns N' Roses from 2000 until 2006, when he left the band to take care of his newborn child. Frank Ferrer, originally brought in as just a replacement drummer for the tour, eventually replaced Mantia as full time drummer for the band. Chinese Democracy was released in 2008, and featured drums from Mantia on every track except the title track. Mantia was also credited with writing the songs "Shackler's Revenge" and "Sorry". Parts of Mantia's drumming on the album were note-for-note re-recordings of Josh Freese's parts, who left the band before Mantia joined. Mantia was also responsible for arrangements on "Shackler's Revenge", "Better", "Street of Dreams", "There Was a Time", "Sorry", "Madagascar", and "Prostitute", initial production on "Shackler's Revenge" and "Sorry", engineering on "Sorry", drum machine and drum programming on "I.R.S." and Logic Pro engineering for the entire album.

After leaving the band, Mantia made a guest appearance (alongside fellow former GNR member Robin Finck) at Guns N' Roses' House of Blues West Hollywood show on March 12, 2012. Mantia played congas on "You're Crazy" and "Rocket Queen". He continued to occasionally work for the band on yet to be released remix material.

Since leaving Guns N' Roses, Mantia has primarily been focused on music behind the scenes as a composer and producer.

Mantia had a brief stint drumming with The Crystal Method in 2013 and 2014 (alongside Guns N' Roses guitarist Richard Fortus). These performances included appearances on Jimmy Kimmel Live, and Last Call with Carson Daly 

In 2017, Mantia toured with Buckethead and Dan Monti as part of Buckethead's live show.

Composing 

Mantia has partnered with musician Melissa Reese on several projects, a composing team dubbed "Brain and Melissa". In 2010, along with Buckethead, they released the multi-CD sets Kind Regards and Best Regards. Brain and Melissa composed part of the soundtrack to the video game Infamous 2, for which they were nominated for "Outstanding Achievement in Original Composition" by the Academy of Interactive Arts and Sciences awards. Other video games the duo worked on include, PlayStation Home, ModNation Racers, Twisted Metal, Fantasia: Music Evolved and Infamous: Second Son (received the nomination Original Dramatic Score, Franchise at the 2014 NAVGTR Awards, shared with Marc Canham and Nathan Johnson). They also scored the films Detention and Power/Rangers. They have worked with music video director Joseph Kahn on several television commercials, including NASCAR, SEAT, and Qoros. In addition, they scored a commercial for Johnnie Walker Blue which featured a computer-generated Bruce Lee. They also worked on several remixes of songs off of Chinese Democracy for a planned remix album.

The two created a stock music album called "Eclectic Cinema" alongside former Guns N' Roses guitarist Paul Tobias, and Guns N' Roses and Buckethead collaborator Pete Scaturro. Mantia has also worked with Tobias on several other stock music tracks.

The duo performed at the halftime show of a Houston Rockets basketball game on November 10, 2017, performing remixes of "Sorry" and "If the World" from Chinese Democracy, and a cover of KISS's "Do You Love Me?" from Destroyer.

Equipment 
Information sourced from "Bryan Mantia's Drum setup".

Drums 

DW Collector's Series Maple drums in Tony Williams Yellow Lacquer with Custom Yellow Hardware
18x24 Bass Drum
8x12, 9x13 Toms
16x16, 16x18 Floor Toms w/ Legs
6x14 Edge Snare

9000 Single Bass Drum Pedal
9500 Hi-Hat
9300 Snare Stand
9700 Straight/Boom Cymbal Stand (x6)
9900 Double Tom Stand (x2)
9100 Throne

Cymbals 
Zildjian
14" A Mastersound Hi-Hats
19" A Medium Thin Crash (2)
20" K CrashRide
20" A Deep Ride
20" A Medium Thin Crash
22" Oriental China "Trash"

Electronics 
Akai MPC 60 II, 3000 LE, 4000
Technics SL-1210MKZ Turntables with a M44Gs stylus
Vestax PMCO5PRO DJMixer

Selected discography and videography 
 Brain's Lessons: Shredding Repis On the Gnar Gnar Rad – 2002 instructional video
 Brain's Worst Drum Instructional DVD Ever – 2008 instructional video

Limbomaniacs
 Stinky Grooves – 1990

Praxis
 Transmutation – 1992
 Sacrifist – 1994
 Metatron – 1994
 Live in Poland – 1997
 Transmutation Live – 1997
 Warszawa – 1999
 Tennessee 2004 – 2007
 Profanation – 2008

Bullmark
 Interstate 76 soundtrack – 1996

Giant Robot
 Giant Robot – 1996

Godflesh
 Songs of Love and Hate – 1996

Tom Waits
Bone Machine – 1992
Mule Variations – 1999
Real Gone – 2004
Orphans: Brawlers, Bawlers & Bastards – 2006

Primus
 Brown Album – 1997
 Rhinoplasty – 1998
 Antipop – 1999

Buckethead;

 I Need 5 Minutes Alone (as Pieces) – 1997
 Colma – 1998
 Monsters and Robots – 1999
 The Cuckoo Clocks of Hell – 2004
 Kevin's Noodle House – 2007
 A Real Diamond in the Rough (tracks 2, 4, & 7) – 2009
 Best Regards (with Melissa Reese) – 2010
 Brain as Hamenoodle – 2010
 Kind Regards (with Melissa Reese) – 2010

El Stew
 No Hesitation – 1999

No Forcefield
Lee's Oriental Massage 415-626-1837 – 2000
God Is an Excuse – 2001

Colonel Claypool's Bucket of Bernie Brains
 The Big Eyeball in the Sky – 2004

Serj Tankian
 Elect the Dead – 2007
 Imperfect Harmonies (track 10) – 2010

Guns N' Roses
 Chinese Democracy – 2008
 "Absurd" – 2021

Science Faxtion
 Living on Another Frequency – 2008

Travis Dickerson

 The Dragons of Eden (with Buckethead) – 2008
 Iconography (with Buckethead) – 2009

Video Games
 Cyberpunk 2077 (with Melissa Reese) – 2020

Notes

References

External links 
 Brain and Melissa official website
 Audio Interview with Brain from the podcast "I'd Hit That"

Living people
American heavy metal drummers
American people of Italian descent
American musicians of Japanese descent
Musicians from California
People from Cupertino, California
Godflesh members
Guns N' Roses members
Primus (band) members
San Jose State University alumni
Musicians from the San Francisco Bay Area
Blue Coast Records artists
1963 births
20th-century American drummers
American male drummers
21st-century American drummers
Colonel Claypool's Bucket of Bernie Brains members
Praxis (band) members